Heiloo is a railway station in Heiloo, Netherlands. The station opened on 1 May 1867. The station is on the Den Helder–Amsterdam railway.

Train services
, the following services call at Heiloo:
2× per hour intercity service (Schagen -) Alkmaar - Amsterdam - Utrecht - Eindhoven - Maastricht
2× per hour local service (sprinter) Hoorn - Alkmaar - Uitgeest - Haarlem - Amsterdam

Bus services

External links
NS website 
Dutch public transport travel planner 

Railway stations in North Holland
Railway stations opened in 1867
Railway stations on the Staatslijn K
Heiloo